People named Kaplansky ( (feminine Kapłańska), also Kaplanski (feminine Kaplanska)) include:

 Abraham Kaplansky (1860–1939), Canadian printer
 Kalmen Kaplansky (1912–1997), Canadian labour and human rights activist
 Irving Kaplansky (1917–2006), Canadian mathematician
 Kaplansky density theorem
 Kaplansky's conjecture
 Kaplansky's theorem on quadratic forms

 Lucy Kaplansky (born 1960), an American folk musician, daughter of Irving Kaplansky
 Shlomo Kaplansky (1884–1950), Zionist politician and President of the Technion – Israel Institute of Technology

See also 
 Kaplan (surname)
 Kaplinsky (surname)

Kohenitic surnames
Polish-language surnames